Tuluganovka is the name of several rural localities in Russia:
Tuluganovka, Volodarsky District, Astrakhan Oblast, a selo in Volodarsky District, Astrakhan Oblast
Tuluganovka, Narimanovsky District, Astrakhan Oblast, a selo in Narimanovsky District, Astrakhan Oblast